Chamkani is a neighborhood of Peshawar in Khyber Pakhtunkhwa, Pakistan. It is named after the Chamkani tribe of Pashtuns, who are based in the Tsamkani District of Paktia Province, Afghanistan, as well as in Kurram District, Khyber Pakhtunkhwa, Pakistan.

The neighborhood was originally named Tsamkani after the Pashtun tribe, but later on changed to Chamkani or Sokani. Its people are called Chamkaniwaal or Sokaniwaal.

References

Populated places in Peshawar District